Uforo Imeh Ebong (born 1989), known professionally as Bongo ByTheWay (formerly Bongo the Drum Gahd) is a Nigerian record producer, best known for producing songs for Kanye West, The Game, Lecrae, and Teyana Taylor, among others. Originally working alongside his cousin Christopher Umana in production outfit L&F (short for "Lost and Found"), Ebong moved to Los Angeles, California for wider music opportunities. L&F parted ways amicably in 2015 to pursue individual songwriting and production careers.

Production and songwriting credits
Credits are courtesy of Discogs, Tidal, Apple Music, Genius, and AllMusic.

«» Released as part of L&F Productions

Guest appearances

Awards and nominations

See also 

 List of Nigerian musicians
 Music of Port Harcourt

References 

Living people
Musicians from Rivers State
Nigerian singer-songwriters
People from Port Harcourt
Year of birth missing (living people)